Bribery Act may refer to:

Bribery Act 2010, British legislation
International Anti-Bribery Act of 1998, United States legislation